Gamil may refer to:

Gamil (name), an Egyptian variant of Jamil (list of people with this name) 
Gamil (Barcelos), Portugal, a parish
El Gamil, Egypt, a fortress/airfield
Gamil Design, an American design firm that became popular when users of Gmail typed the wrong address

See also
Cemal
Cemil
Gamal (disambiguation)
Jamal
Jamil
Jamila (disambiguation)